A logistic function or logistic curve is a common S-shaped curve (sigmoid curve) with equation

where

The logistic function finds applications in a range of fields, including biology (especially ecology), biomathematics, chemistry, demography, economics, geoscience, mathematical psychology, probability, sociology, political science, linguistics, statistics, and artificial neural networks. A generalization of the logistic function is the hyperbolastic function of type I.

The standard logistic function, where , is sometimes simply called the sigmoid. It is also sometimes called the expit, being the inverse of the logit.

History 

The logistic function was introduced in a series of three papers by Pierre François Verhulst between 1838 and 1847, who devised it as a model of population growth by adjusting the exponential growth model, under the guidance of Adolphe Quetelet. Verhulst first devised the function in the mid 1830s, publishing a brief note in 1838, then presented an expanded analysis and named the function in 1844 (published 1845); the third paper adjusted the correction term in his model of Belgian population growth.

The initial stage of growth is approximately exponential (geometric); then, as saturation begins, the growth slows to linear (arithmetic), and at maturity, growth stops. Verhulst did not explain the choice of the term "logistic", but it is presumably in contrast to the logarithmic curve, and by analogy with arithmetic and geometric. The term is unrelated to the military and management term logistics, which is instead from  "lodgings", though some believe the Greek term also influenced logistics; see  for details.

Mathematical properties 

The logistic function has the symmetry property that

Thus,  is an odd function.

The logistic function is an offset and scaled hyperbolic tangent function:

or

This follows from

Derivative 

The standard logistic function has an easily calculated derivative. The derivative is known as the density of the logistic distribution:

The logistic distribution has mean x0 and variance π/3k

Integral 
Conversely, its antiderivative can be computed by the substitution , since , so (dropping the constant of integration)

In artificial neural networks, this is known as the softplus function and (with scaling) is a smooth approximation of the ramp function, just as the logistic function (with scaling) is a smooth approximation of the Heaviside step function.

Logistic differential equation 
The standard logistic function is the solution of the simple first-order non-linear ordinary differential equation

with boundary condition . This equation is the continuous version of the logistic map. Note that the reciprocal logistic function is solution to a simple first-order linear ordinary differential equation.

This yields an unstable equilibrium at 0 and a stable equilibrium at 1, and thus for any function value greater than 0 and less than 1, it grows to 1.

The logistic equation is a special case of the Bernoulli differential equation and has the following solution:

Choosing the constant of integration  gives the other well known form of the definition of the logistic curve:

More quantitatively, as can be seen from the analytical solution, the logistic curve shows early exponential growth for negative argument, which reaches to linear growth of slope 1/4 for an argument near 0, then approaches 1 with an exponentially decaying gap.

The logistic function is the inverse of the natural logit function

 

and so converts the logarithm of odds into a probability.  The conversion from the log-likelihood ratio of two alternatives also takes the form of a logistic curve.

In many modeling applications, the more general form  
 
can be desirable. Its solution is the shifted and scaled sigmoid .

The hyperbolic-tangent relationship leads to another form for the logistic function's derivative:

which ties the logistic function into the logistic distribution.

Rotational symmetry about (0, 1/2)
The sum of the logistic function and its reflection about the vertical axis, is

The logistic function is thus rotationally symmetrical about the point (0, 1/2).

Applications 

Link created an extension of Wald's theory of sequential analysis to a distribution-free accumulation of random variables until either a positive or negative bound is first equaled or exceeded. This is the first proof that the logistic function may have a stochastic process as its basis. Link provides a century of examples of "logistic" experimental results and a newly derived relation between this probability and the time of absorption at the boundaries.

In ecology: modeling population growth 

A typical application of the logistic equation is a common model of population growth (see also population dynamics), originally due to Pierre-François Verhulst in 1838, where the rate of reproduction is proportional to both the existing population and the amount of available resources, all else being equal. The Verhulst equation was published after Verhulst had read Thomas Malthus' An Essay on the Principle of Population, which describes the Malthusian growth model of simple (unconstrained) exponential growth. Verhulst derived his logistic equation to describe the self-limiting growth of a biological population. The equation was rediscovered in 1911 by A. G. McKendrick for the growth of bacteria in broth and experimentally tested using a technique for nonlinear parameter estimation. The equation is also sometimes called the Verhulst-Pearl equation following its rediscovery in 1920 by Raymond Pearl (1879–1940) and Lowell Reed (1888–1966) of the Johns Hopkins University. Another scientist, Alfred J. Lotka derived the equation again in 1925, calling it the law of population growth.

Letting  represent population size ( is often used in ecology instead) and  represent time, this model is formalized by the differential equation:

In the equation, the early, unimpeded growth rate is modeled by the first term . The value of the rate  represents the proportional increase of the population  in one unit of time. Later, as the population grows, the modulus of the second term (which multiplied out is ) becomes almost as large as the first, as some members of the population  interfere with each other by competing for some critical resource, such as food or living space. This antagonistic effect is called the bottleneck, and is modeled by the value of the parameter . The competition diminishes the combined growth rate, until the value of  ceases to grow (this is called maturity of the population).
The solution to the equation (with  being the initial population) is

where

It is important to stress that the carrying capacity is asymptotically reached independently of the initial value , and also in the case that .

In ecology, species are sometimes referred to as -strategist or -strategist depending upon the selective processes that have shaped their life history strategies.

Integral 
The antiderivative of the ecological form of the logistic function can be computed by the substitution , since

Time-varying carrying capacity 

A particularly important case is that of carrying capacity that varies periodically with period :

Another interesting generalization is to consider that the carrying capacity  is a function of the population at an earlier time, capturing a delay in the way population modifies its environment. This leads to a logistic delay equation, which has a very rich behavior, with bistability in some parameter range, as well as a monotonic decay to zero, smooth exponential growth, punctuated unlimited growth (i.e., multiple S-shapes), punctuated growth or alternation to a stationary level, oscillatory approach to a stationary level, sustainable oscillations, finite-time singularities as well as finite-time death.

In statistics and machine learning 
Logistic functions are used in several roles in statistics. For example, they are the cumulative distribution function of the logistic family of distributions, and they are, a bit simplified, used to model the chance a chess player has to beat their opponent in the Elo rating system. More specific examples now follow.

Logistic regression 

Logistic functions are used in logistic regression to model how the probability  of an event may be affected by one or more explanatory variables: an example would be to have the model

Logistic regression and other log-linear models are also commonly used in machine learning. A generalisation of the logistic function to multiple inputs is the softmax activation function, used in multinomial logistic regression.

Another application of the logistic function is in the Rasch model, used in item response theory. In particular, the Rasch model forms a basis for maximum likelihood estimation of the locations of objects or persons on a continuum, based on collections of categorical data, for example the abilities of persons on a continuum based on responses that have been categorized as correct and incorrect.

Neural networks 
Logistic functions are often used in neural networks to introduce nonlinearity in the model or to clamp signals to within a specified interval.  A popular neural net element computes a linear combination of its input signals, and applies a bounded logistic function as the activation function to the result; this model can be seen as a "smoothed" variant of the classical threshold neuron.

A common choice for the activation or "squashing" functions, used to clip for large magnitudes to keep the response of the neural network bounded is

which is a logistic function.

These relationships result in simplified implementations of artificial neural networks with artificial neurons. Practitioners caution that sigmoidal functions which are antisymmetric about the origin (e.g. the hyperbolic tangent) lead to faster convergence when training networks with backpropagation.

The logistic function is itself the derivative of another proposed activation function, the softplus.

In medicine: modeling of growth of tumors 

Another application of logistic curve is in medicine, where the logistic differential equation is used to model the growth of tumors. This application can be considered an extension of the above-mentioned use in the framework of ecology (see also the Generalized logistic curve, allowing for more parameters). Denoting with  the size of the tumor at time , its dynamics are governed by

which is of the type

where  is the proliferation rate of the tumor.

If a chemotherapy is started with a log-kill effect, the equation may be revised to be

where  is the therapy-induced death rate. In the idealized case of very long therapy,  can be modeled as a periodic function (of period ) or (in case of continuous infusion therapy) as a constant function, and one has that

i.e. if the average therapy-induced death rate is greater than the baseline proliferation rate, then there is the eradication of the disease. Of course, this is an oversimplified model of both the growth and the therapy (e.g. it does not take into account the phenomenon of clonal resistance).

In medicine: modeling of a pandemic 

A novel infectious pathogen to which a population has no immunity will generally spread exponentially in the early stages, while the supply of susceptible individuals is plentiful.  The SARS-CoV-2 virus that causes COVID-19 exhibited exponential growth early in the course of infection in several countries in early 2020. Factors including a lack of susceptible hosts (through the continued spread of infection until it passes the threshold for herd immunity) or reduction in the accessibility of potential hosts through physical distancing measures, may result in exponential-looking epidemic curves first linearizing (replicating the "logarithmic" to "logistic" transition first noted by Pierre-François Verhulst, as noted above) and then reaching a maximal limit.

A logistic function, or related functions (e.g. the Gompertz function) are usually used in a descriptive or phenomenological manner because they fit well not only to the early exponential rise, but to the eventual levelling off of the pandemic as the population develops a herd immunity. This is in contrast to actual models of pandemics which attempt to formulate a description based on the dynamics of the pandemic (e.g. contact rates, incubation times, social distancing, etc.). Some simple models have been developed, however, which yield a logistic solution.

Modeling early COVID-19 cases 

A generalized logistic function, also called the Richards growth curve, has been applied to model the early phase of the COVID-19 outbreak. The authors fit the generalized logistic function to the cumulative number of infected cases, here referred to as infection trajectory. There are different parameterizations of the generalized logistic function in the literature. One frequently used forms is

The flexibility of the curve  is due to the parameter : (i) if  then the curve reduces to the logistic function, and (ii) as  approaches zero, the curve converges to the Gompertz function. In epidemiological modeling, and  represent the final epidemic size, infection rate, and lag phase, respectively.

One of the benefits of using a growth function such as the generalized logistic function in epidemiological modeling is its relatively easy application to the multilevel model framework, where information from different geographic regions can be pooled together.

In chemistry: reaction models 
The concentration of reactants and products in autocatalytic reactions follow the logistic function.
The degradation of Platinum group metal-free (PGM-free) oxygen reduction reaction (ORR) catalyst in fuel cell cathodes follows the logistic decay function, suggesting an autocatalytic degradation mechanism.

In physics: Fermi–Dirac distribution 
The logistic function determines the statistical distribution of fermions over the energy states of a system in thermal equilibrium. In particular, it is the distribution of the probabilities that each possible energy level is occupied by a fermion, according to Fermi–Dirac statistics.

In material science: Phase diagrams 
See Diffusion bonding.

In linguistics: language change 
In linguistics, the logistic function can be used to model language change: an innovation that is at first marginal begins to spread more quickly with time, and then more slowly as it becomes more universally adopted.

In agriculture: modeling crop response 
The logistic S-curve can be used for modeling the crop response to changes in growth factors. There are two types of response functions:  positive  and negative growth curves. For example, the crop yield may increase with increasing value of the growth factor up to a certain level (positive function), or it may decrease with increasing growth factor values (negative function owing to a negative growth factor), which situation requires an inverted S-curve.

In economics and sociology: diffusion of innovations 
The logistic function can be used to illustrate the progress of the diffusion of an innovation through its life cycle.

In The Laws of Imitation (1890), Gabriel Tarde describes the rise and spread of new ideas through imitative chains. The ensuing situation halts or stabilizes the progress of the innovation, which approaches an asymptote.

In a Sovereign state, the subnational units (constituent states or cities) may use loans to finance their projects. However, this funding source is usually subject to strict legal rules as well as to economy scarcity constraints, specially the resources the banks can lend (due to their equity or Basel limits). These restrictions, which represent a saturation level, along with an exponential rush in an economic competition for money, create a public finance diffusion of credit pleas and the aggregate national response is a sigmoid curve.

In the history of economy, when new products are introduced there is an intense amount of research and development which leads to dramatic improvements in quality and reductions in cost.  This leads to a period of rapid industry growth. Some of the more famous examples are: railroads, incandescent light bulbs, electrification, cars and air travel. Eventually, dramatic improvement and cost reduction opportunities are exhausted, the product or process are in widespread use with few remaining potential new customers, and markets become saturated.

Logistic analysis was used in papers by several researchers at the International Institute of Applied Systems Analysis (IIASA). These papers deal with the diffusion of various innovations, infrastructures and energy source substitutions and the role of work in the economy as well as with the long economic cycle. Long economic cycles were investigated by Robert Ayres (1989). Cesare Marchetti published on long economic cycles and on diffusion of innovations. Arnulf Grübler's book (1990) gives a detailed account of the diffusion of infrastructures including canals, railroads, highways and airlines, showing that their diffusion followed logistic shaped curves.

Carlota Perez used a logistic curve to illustrate the long (Kondratiev) business cycle with the following labels: beginning of a technological era as irruption, the ascent as frenzy, the rapid build out as synergy and the completion as maturity.

See also

 Cross fluid
 Diffusion of innovations
 Exponential growth
 Hyperbolic growth
 Generalised logistic function
 Gompertz curve
 Heaviside step function
 Hill equation (biochemistry)
 Hubbert curve
 List of mathematical functions
 Logistic distribution
 Logistic map
 Logistic regression
 Logistic smooth-transmission model
 Logit
 Log-likelihood ratio
 Malthusian growth model
 Michaelis–Menten equation
 Population dynamics
 r/K selection theory
 Rectifier (neural networks)
 Shifted Gompertz distribution
 Tipping point (sociology)

Notes

References 

 
 Published as:

External links 

 L.J. Linacre, Why logistic ogive and not autocatalytic curve?, accessed 2009-09-12.
 https://web.archive.org/web/20060914155939/http://luna.cas.usf.edu/~mbrannic/files/regression/Logistic.html
 
 Online experiments with JSXGraph
 Esses are everywhere.
 Seeing the s-curve is everything.
 Restricted Logarithmic Growth with Injection

Special functions
Differential equations
Population
Population ecology
Logistic regression
Growth curves